Ronald Joseph Radke (born December 15, 1983), better known by his nickname, Ronnie, is an American singer, songwriter, rapper, musician and record producer, best known as the current lead singer of rock band Falling in Reverse and the former lead singer of band Escape the Fate.

Radke rose to popularity as the lead singer for post-hardcore band Escape the Fate, but was kicked out in 2008 after being sentenced to prison for violating probation for owning brass knuckles in the state of Nevada in 2006. While in prison, Radke started a new band, Falling in Reverse, that didn't make a formal announcement until his release in December 2010. Radke spent much of his time writing for his new band.

As a solo musician, Radke released a rap mixtape, Watch Me, in 2014, which included collaborations with Deuce, Tyler Carter, Sy Ari Da Kid, Jacoby Shaddix, Danny Worsnop, Andy Biersack, and Craig Mabbitt.

Early life

Ronald Joseph Radke was born on December 15, 1983, in St. Rose Hospital, in Las Vegas, Nevada, one of three children born to Russell Radke, the others being his brothers, Anthony James Radke (1980-2013) and Matthew Radke. Radke's mother abused drugs and was absent from his childhood, which he said caused him to have a general lack of respect towards women as an adult although he later forgave her when he posted a picture of her on Instagram after a Falling in Reverse show in 2014. Radke is part Blackfoot Indian and Portuguese.

Radke learned to play piano and guitar in his first bands. He began by playing Blink-182 songs on guitar. The first song he could play was "Dammit". He formed several bands while in high school. Radke ran away from home to play in his first band, with his friend Mitch, called 3.0. which according to Radke "sounded exactly like Blink 182". He lived with Mitch and his mother for a time. They played a few shows at various venues such as Chain Reaction and the Huntridge in Las Vegas. After the band, Radke moved back in with his dad, re-entered school, and dropped out again. He stated in an Alternative Press interview, "I just couldn't for some reason pay attention; I just daydreamed about everything else but what I'm supposed to be doing." Radke stated that the second band that he was in was called Lefty. Radke met Max Green (from the band Almost Heroes) at a talent show. Radke's microphone fell and Max picked it up for him while they were on stage and they became friends, forming the band True Story, which recorded a demo containing the track "This Is Not the End". Radke started screaming in the band after being inspired by Thrice, then started to sing, slowly forming Escape the Fate.

"Listen Up!" was written by Radke in 1998 as well as "Besides the Issues" and "The Worst Time". In 2001, Radke, with his friend, producer Michael "Elvis" Baskette, recorded the songs "Listen Up!", "The Worst Time" and "The Departure". Both recorded instruments together and also composed the themes for "As You're Falling Down", "Make Up" and "Not Good Enough for Truth in Cliche", recorded in 2005, along with Escape the Fate.

History

Escape the Fate (2004–2008)
In high school, Radke and Max Green were close friends. In 2004, Bryan Money, looking for a vocalist, contacted Max who referred him to Radke. Bryan agreed and began auditions for a drummer. Robert Ortiz was selected, and Escape the Fate was formed. A few weeks later, Omar Espinosa, who at the time was the guitarist for Lovehatehero, joined as rhythm guitarist. The band began to play in the post-hardcore scene in Las Vegas. During that time Carson Allen joined as keyboardist. The band recorded the demo Escape the Fate EP. They signed in early 2006 with Epitaph Records after winning a radio contest judged by My Chemical Romance, which launched their career.

In May 2006, recording for the EP There's No Sympathy for the Dead began, as well as some songs from the debut album, Dying Is Your Latest Fashion. Both were produced by Radke's friend Michael "Elvis" Baskette.

Radke was later kicked out of Escape the Fate in 2008 after he was sentenced to two and a half years in prison for violating a probation given to him for owning brass knuckles. Radke had multiple previous brushes with the law due to prior narcotics offenses. He was replaced with former Blessthefall singer Craig Mabbitt.

During Radke's incarceration, a feud grew between Radke and Mabbitt. Escape the Fate insulted Radke during live performances and Radke responded with vulgar posts on social media. When Mabbitt began dating Radke's ex-girlfriend, who had starred in an earlier Escape the Fate music video, Radke asked Mabbitt, "How does my dick taste??" on Myspace. In response to a heckler during an Escape the Fate show at 2009's Warped Tour, Mabbitt yelled, "You miss the old singer? He’s locked up in Nevada. Go suck his fucking cock."

In 2014, Escape the Fate and Falling in Reverse co-headlined the "Bury the Hatchet" tour, signifying an end to the hostilities.

Falling in Reverse (2008–present)
While serving his sentence at High Desert State Prison, Radke wrote the first material for his upcoming band, which he described as "Norma Jean or Underoath with Katy Perry choruses." With the help of Nason Schoeffler, Radke formed Falling in Reverse, originally named From Behind these Walls. Upon his release from prison in December 2010, Radke announced his return to recording. Falling In Reverse released their first single "Raised by Wolves" in 2010, followed by the album The Drug in Me Is You which was released on July 26, 2011, through Epitaph Records.

Falling in Reverse's first two albums reached the top 20 in the United States, and all four have charted in the top 40. The band's song "Popular Monster" became a No. 1 hit on Billboard's Mainstream Rock chart in 2020, their first chart-topper.

Solo and Watch Me (2013–present)
On May 31, 2013, Radke launched his YouTube channel and released a solo song, "Fair-Weather Fans". The song is described as "a song Ronnie made dedicated to all the people who didn't believe in him." On June 1, he released a second song, called "What Up Earth?".

In part 3 of his interview with Alternative Press, Radke stated that he is creating a rap mixtape, produced by Charles Massabo (Kallaghan Records) that will feature some well known rap artists, the mixtape will be released in December 2013 for free. The first single off that mixtape, "Blacklist", which features , was released on July 5, 2013, on YouTube.

A diss track titled "I Wash Cars" (also featuring ), which attacks Sumerian Records and its founder Ash Avildsen, Lorenzo "The Main Event" Antonucci, and electronicore band I See Stars, was leaked online. Ash and Lorenzo released a diss track in reply to "I Wash Cars" titled "When Ronnie Met Sally" attacking Radke. The feud between the two groups has since been resolved, and Radke is now on good terms with I See Stars, Sumerian Records, and Antonucci. On October 28, 2013, it was announced that Ronnie Radke and Craig Mabbit of Escape the Fate had made up and are now on good terms. Also the two mentioned their two bands will be touring together in early 2014.

In an interview with Loudwire, he has stated that he is in the process of making a rap mixtape, which according to Radke will include an artist on every song. He has also stated that the mixtape may be released for around Christmas. On Christmas Day, he revealed a website through which subscribers received a new song, "Destiny", from the mixtape, now titled Watch Me. The track-list was also revealed but some songs did not contain feature other artists like he originally claimed. As of 2021, 3 songs from the mixtape don't have official releases.

Personal life
Radke has one daughter from his relationship with model Crissy Henderson. At one point, he became engaged to Henderson but their relationship ended in 2013, due to infidelity on his part.

Radke has openly denounced religion due to its treatment of LGBT people, saying he felt bitter and found hypocrisy in that Christianity was initially discriminatory against gay people but became accepting of them later on.

Radke's older brother, Anthony, died as the result of a traffic collision in 2013. By Anthony, Radke has one niece, Sabrina, and four nephews, Troy, Nathan, Joshua, and Dylan.

Since late 2018, Radke has been in a relationship with Saraya Bevis, better known as former WWE wrestler Paige.

Ronnie has a memoir, titled I Can Explain (written with longtime journalist Ryan J. Downey). The book started shipping out to pre-orders mid-December 2022.

Legal issues

Involvement in killing and prison sentence 
On May 6, 2006, then 22-year-old Radke met with Marcel Colquitt near Shadow Ridge High School, at the north end of Decatur Boulevard, at approximately 2:30 PM to fight. Each man brought additional men to support them in the fight. During the fight, 22-year-old Chase Rader, a man who had accompanied Radke, shot 18-year-old Michael Allen Cook, killing him, as well as wounding another man, Colquitt's brother. Rader was arrested for and charged with murder but the district attorney declined to prosecute him, despite his confession, as it was determined Rader acted in self-defense.

Radke pleaded guilty to battery with substantial bodily harm to owning and bringing brass knuckles to the brawl and subsequently was placed on probation for five years, and he was ordered to pay $92,372 in restitution to Ceda Freeman, the mother of Cook. After Radke violated the terms of his probation, he was sentenced to serve two and a half years in prison. Owning brass knuckles in Nevada is illegal.

Because of his prison sentence, Escape the Fate fired Radke. Craig Mabbitt, formerly of the band Blessthefall, replaced the imprisoned Radke.

Domestic violence arrest 
On May 1, 2012, Radke was accused of striking his then-girlfriend, Sally Watts, and was subsequently arrested in Glendale, California on August 6, 2012, after he'd failed to make an appearance at any of the scheduled court hearings. He was officially charged with a misdemeanor count of corporal injury and misdemeanor false imprisonment by the Los Angeles County Sheriff's Department. He was released on $30,000 bail. On May 14, 2014, Radke pleaded no contest to disturbance of the peace.

Six Flags assault arrest 
On September 29, 2012, Radke was performing as part of Falling in Reverse for FestEVIL, a metal festival for Six Flags Great Adventure's Fright Fest event, when he threw three microphone stands into the audience at the close of a performance, injuring a 16-year-old girl, who was taken to the hospital, and a 24-year-old man, who was treated at the scene. Radke was charged with simple assault and aggravated assault and released on $25,000 bail. Radke publicly apologized for his actions, saying that his actions were not in anger and that he hadn't intended to hurt anyone. Six Flags subsequently decided to ban hard rock and heavy metal bands from performing at the park in the future.

Rape allegation and defamation lawsuit 
On June 10, 2015, it was reported that Radke had been publicly accused of sexual assault by a 25-year-old woman. The accuser alleged that Radke (with his bus driver present) had sexually assaulted her after Falling in Reverse's performance at Murray Theater on June 3, 2015. Though it was determined that Radke had contact with the woman, police found no evidence that Radke or his entourage had assaulted the woman as she'd claimed they did, and an eyewitness reported that she was visibly intoxicated upon exiting Radke's vehicle. Radke subsequently filed a lawsuit for defamation.

Discography

With Escape the Fate
Studio albums
 Dying Is Your Latest Fashion (2006)
Extended plays
 There's No Sympathy for the Dead (2006)
Demos
 Escape the Fate (2005)
 Situations (2007)

With Falling in Reverse 
Studio albums
 The Drug in Me Is You (2011)
 Fashionably Late (2013)
 Just Like You (2015)
 Coming Home (2017)

Extended plays
 Neon Zombie (2023)

Solo career

Mixtapes
 Watch Me (2014)

Singles

Collaborations

Accolades

References

External links

 
 Ronnie Radke on Instagram
 Ronnie Radke on Twitter
 Ronnie Radke on TikTok

1983 births
Living people
American male singers
Singers from Nevada
American heavy metal singers
Escape the Fate members
21st-century American singers
Critics of religions
American people of Blackfoot descent
American people of Portuguese descent
Twitch (service) streamers
Falling in Reverse members